The Canon PowerShot G16 is a digital compact camera announced by Canon on August 22, 2013.

Successor
No G16 successor was announced by Canon.

New G Series
The Canon PowerShot G7X, G3X, and G5X are the new G series compacts announced by Canon; all of these include a 1-inch sensor for better performance.

References
http://www.dpreview.com/products/canon/compacts/canon_g16/specifications
http://thenewcamera.com/tag/canon-g5x/ and http://thenewcamera.com/tag/canon-g9x/

G16
Cameras introduced in 2013